FC Nantes won Division 1 season 1976/1977 of the French Association Football League with 58 points.

Participating teams

 Angers SCO
 SEC Bastia
 Bordeaux
 Stade Lavallois
 RC Lens
 Lille
 Olympique Lyonnais
 Olympique de Marseille
 FC Metz
 AS Nancy
 FC Nantes
 OGC Nice
 Nîmes Olympique
 Paris Saint-Germain FC
 Stade de Reims
 Stade Rennais FC
 AS Saint-Étienne
 FC Sochaux-Montbéliard
 Troyes AF
 US Valenciennes-Anzin

League table

Promoted from Division 2, who will play in Division 1 season 1977/1978
 RC Strasbourg: Champion of Division 2, winner of Division 2 group B
 AS Monaco: Runner-up, winner of Division 2 group A
 FC Rouen: Third place, winner of barrages

Results

Top goalscorers

References

 Division 1 season 1976-1977 at pari-et-gagne.com

Ligue 1 seasons
French
1